WRESAT or Weapons Research Establishment Satellite was the first Australian satellite, named after its designer. WRESAT was launched on 29 November 1967 using a modified American Redstone rocket with two upper stages known as a Sparta from the Woomera Test Range in South Australia. The Sparta (left over from the joint Australian-US-UK Sparta program), was donated by the United States. Australia became the seventh nation to have an Earth satellite after this launch, and the third nation to launch from its own territory, after the Soviet Union and the United States (the UK, Canada and Italy's satellites were also launched on American rockets unlike the French Astérix, which launched on an indigenous rocket out of Algeria).

WRESAT circled the Earth on a nearly polar course, and later reentered the atmosphere after 642 revolutions on 10 January 1968, over the Atlantic Ocean. The battery-operated satellite sent data during its first 73 orbits of the Earth.

See also

 Timeline of artificial satellites and space probes

References

External links
 Synopsis of WRESAT
 History of SPARTA test series
 A personal reminiscence of WRESAT (Broken Link)
 National Film Archive film clips of WRESAT
 WRESAT

Satellites formerly orbiting Earth
Spacecraft launched in 1967
First artificial satellites of a country
1967 in Australia
Satellites of Australia